Qiz Qaleh (also Romanized as Qiz Qal‘eh; also known as Qez Qal‘eh and Qez Qal‘eh-ye Kharābeh) is a village in Nur Ali Beyk Rural District, in the Central District of Saveh County, Markazi Province, Iran.  At the 2006 census, its population was 23, in 5 families.

References 

Populated places in Saveh County